Sfax War Cemetery is a war cemetery located near Sfax, Sfax, Tunisia, currently maintained by the Commonwealth War Graves Commission. It contains a single Commonwealth burial from World War I, 1253 Commonwealth burials from World War II (52 of them have yet to be identified), and the grave of one Greek soldier from World War II.

Notable interments 
 Private Eric Anderson VC
 Colonel Edward Orlando Kellett DSO
 Second Lieutenant Moana-Nui-a-Kiwa Ngarimu VC
 Company Havildar-Major Chhelu Ram VC
 Lieutenant Colonel Derek Anthony Seagrim VC

References

External links 
 

Cemeteries in Tunisia
Commonwealth War Graves Commission cemeteries in Tunisia
World War II sites in Tunisia
Sfax